Manohar Singh (12 April 1938 – 14 November 2002) was an Indian theatre actor-director and character actor in Hindi films. He is best known for his performances in films such as Party (1984) and Daddy (1989). Starting his acting career from theatre, he went on to become a theatre director and later the chief of National School of Drama Repertory Company, 1976 to 1988, before switching to cinema. As a theatre actor his best known performances were in Tughlaq, directed by Ebrahim Alkazi; Himmat Mai and Begum Barve by Nissar and Amal Allana.

He was awarded the 1982 Sangeet Natak Akademi Award for Acting (Hindi theatre) by Sangeet Natak Akademi. In 2003, a photo exhibition on his work in theatre was organized at the Art Heritage gallery, Delhi chronicling his journey in theatre starting from his first play The Caucasian Chalk Circle (1968), as a student at the National School of Drama, to plays such as Tughlaq, King Lear, Kaho Katha Khajuraho Ki, Himmat Mai (Mother Courage) and The Threepenny Opera.

He provides the voice-over in the annual Shriram Bharatiya Kala Kendra production "Ram". The audience can hear the commentary in his voice, providing structure and continuity to the narrative.

Biography
Born in 1938 in a very small village called Kwara near Shimla in Himachal Pradesh, Manohar Singh got his first job in the state government-run Drama Division. He graduated from National School of Drama (NSD) in 1971, and soon after started directing plays with NSD Repertory Company, starting with Qatl Ki Hawas in 1971. Later in 1976 he became the second chief of the NSD Repertory Company and remained so until 1988. He was awarded the 1982 Sangeet Natak Akademi Award by Sangeet Natak Akademi, India's National Academy of Music, dance and Drama.

He is best known for his spectacular performance in the title role of Tughlaq, directed by his mentor Ebrahim Alkazi, the founder of NSD. After quitting NSD in the late 80s, he got active in the Delhi theatre scene, doing some memorable plays such as Pagla Raja (King Lear), Himmat Mai (Brecht's Mother Courage), Begum Barve and Nagamandalam (Girish Karnad), with well-known theatre personalities, Amal and Nissar Allana.

He had a long film and television career that started with the controversial film based on an emergency, Kissa Kursi Ka, that also starred Shabana Azmi. He did Govind Nihalani's Party, Mrinal Sen's Ek Din Achanak, Yeh Woh Manzil To Nahin, Rudaali, Daddy and went to play many powerful roles in over 27 films, including some mainstream films such as Chandni and Lamhe with Yash Chopra. His last film was Everybody Says I'm Fine! in 2001.

He appeared in many successful serials on television including Neena Gupta's Dard and Pal Chhin.

He died of lung cancer on 14 November 2002, in New Delhi.

Filmography

Films

 Kissa Kursi Ka (1977)
 Party (1984)
 Damul (1985)
 Tamas (1986)
 New Delhi Times (1986)
 Yeh Woh Manzil To Nahin (1987)
 Main Azaad Hoon (1989)
 Daddy (1989)
 Ek Din Achanak (1989)
 Chandni (1989)
Hamari Shaadi (1990)
 Lekin... (1990)
 Patthar Ke Phool (1991)
 Kasba (1991)
 Diksha (1991)
 Lamhe (1991)
 Sadak (1991)
 Tirangaa (1992)
 Karm Yodha (1992)
 Rudaali (1993)
 Gunaah (1993)
 Divya Shakti (1993)
 Aaja Meri Jaan (1993)
 1942: A Love Story (1993)
 Tarpan (1994)
 Dushmani: A Violent Love Story (1995)
 Bhairavi (1996)
 Everybody Says I'm Fine! (2001)

Television
 Raag Durbari (TV series)
 Mulla Nasiruddin (TV series) (1990)
 Raj Se Swaraj (TV series)
 Dard (TV series) (1993)
 Gumraah (TV series) (1995)
 Khamosh (TV series) (1996)
 Mahayagya (1997)
 Tere Mere Sapne (1998)
 Pal Chhin (TV series) (1999)

Theatrography
 Caucasian Chalk Circle (1968)
 Antigone (1975)
 Tughlaq (1975)
 Look Back in Anger
 Othello
 Danton's Death
 King Lear
 Three Penny Opera
 Mahabhoj
 Nagamandal
 Kaho Katha Khajuraho Ki
 Himmat Mai
 Begum Barve

Legacy
In 2003, NSD instituted an award in his memory, titled Manohar Singh Smriti Puruskar, to be awarded to a young graduate (up to the age of 50) of the school.

See also
 Theatre of India
Bhartendu Academy of Dramatic Arts

References

Further reading
 Manohar Singh (Monograph on his life), Jaidev Taneja, NSD PUBLICATIONS, 2002.

External links
 

Indian theatre directors
Indian male stage actors
Indian male film actors
1938 births
2002 deaths
Male actors from Himachal Pradesh
National School of Drama alumni
Male actors in Hindi cinema
Deaths from lung cancer
Indian male television actors
Recipients of the Sangeet Natak Akademi Award
Hindi theatre
20th-century Indian male actors
People from Shimla district
Male actors in Hindi television